"Kall som is" is a song written by Anders Glenmark and Ingela 'Pling' Forsman, and performed by Karin and Anders Glenmark at Melodifestivalen 1984, where it ended up 4th.

The song was also recorded by Herreys, releasing it as a single late in 1984, peaking at 18th position at the Swedish singles chart.

Charts

Herreys recording

References 

1984 songs
1984 singles
Herreys songs
Melodifestivalen songs of 1984
Songs with lyrics by Ingela Forsman
Swedish-language songs
Songs written by Anders Glenmark